The 2008 California wildfire season was one of the most devastating in the state of the 21st century. While 6,255 fires occurred, about two-thirds as many as in 2007, the total area burned— —far exceeded that of previous years.

By July 5, 2008, 328 wildfires were burning, and those fires were only 81% contained. For the first time since 1977, the US military helped with ground-based firefighting, when Governor Arnold Schwarzenegger dispatched 400 California National Guard troops, including Chief Medical Officer Susan Pangelinan, to manage fire lines. He said the number of fires had stretched the state's fire-fighting resources thin. "One never has resources for 1,700 fires. Who has the resources for that?" Schwarzenegger said, adding, "Something is happening, clearly. There's more need for resources than ever before... it's fire season all year round."

Fires 
Below is a list of all fires that exceeded  during the 2008 fire season. The list is taken from CAL FIRE's list of large fires.

Summer fires 
The Summer 2008 fires were a concentrated outbreak of wildfires during the late spring and summer of 2008. Over 3,596 individual fires were burning at the height of the period, burning large portions of forests and chaparral in California, injuring at least 34 individuals and killing 32. The majority of the fires were started by lightning from dry thunderstorms on June 20, although some earlier fires ignited during mid-May. International aid from Greece, Cyprus, Chile, Argentina, Brazil, Australia, Canada, Mexico, and New Zealand helped fight the fires.

The first of the wildfires was the Big Horn Fire, which ignited on May 13. Three other minor wildfires ignited subsequently, but were extinguished by May 17. On May 20, the Avocado Fire ignited in Fresno County, only to be extinguished 2 days later. On May 22, 2008, the human-caused Summit Fire broke out in the Santa Cruz Mountains, which became the first major fire.

On July 5, 2008, California Governor Schwarzenegger commented that "I've been driving up and down the state of California going to all the various fires, and you can imagine, this state is very prepared for fire, but when you wake up one morning and have 500 fires across the state, it was a real shock to me... only to find the next morning there were 1,000 fires, and the next morning 1,400 fires, and then 1,700 fires igniting over 14 days."

The Gap Fire near Goleta in Santa Barbara County burned . The fire was contained on July 29, after several weeks of activity.

On July 12, 2008, the area burned reached , exceeding the estimated  burned by the 2003 California wildfires, making the Summer 2008 wildfires the greatest wildfire event in Californian history, in terms of burned area. On that date 20,274 personnel had been committed to fight the fires. Total resources included 467 hand crews, 1,503 engines, 423 water tenders, 291 bulldozers, 142 helicopters, 400 soldiers and numerous air tankers. The fire was responsible for the deaths of 23 individuals.

On July 25, a blaze sparked by target shooting broke out in Mariposa County, in the Sierra Nevada foothills of central California. Residents were evacuated from approximately 300 homes that were immediately threatened, with an additional 4,000 homes placed on standby for evacuation in Midpines, Greeley Hill, and Coulterville.

During August, wildfire activity began to diminish, although there were still hundreds of wildfires still burning. On August 29, wildfire activity had largely ended, although three more wildfires ignited after September 1, beginning with the Gladding Fire. On September 10, the Colony Fire was 100% contained, ending the last of the Summer 2008 California wildfires.

In addition, the Summer 2008 fires cost over $92.38 million (2008 USD) to fight.

The Basin Complex Fire in the Ventana Wilderness became the third largest wildfire in California's history based on size (until it was surpassed in size by the 2013 Rim Fire), and also the second-costliest wildfire to extinguish in U.S. history.

Weather 
The fires broke out after three years of below-normal rainfall dehydrated much of California's forests and woodlands, making them prone to wildfires. As vegetation turned into bone-dry tinder in early June, Governor Arnold Schwarzenegger declared a statewide drought for the first time in 17 years. Dry thunderstorms and lightning, rarely seen on the California coastline in June, rolled onshore on the weekend of June 20–21. The storm unleashed 25,000 to 26,000 dry lightning strikes across Northern and Central California, igniting more than 2,000 fires. The number of wildfires skyrocketed in the days after the thunderstorms and high daily daytime temperatures of over  dramatically increased the various fires' growth. The same thunderstorms also caused fires in Oregon.

A heat wave commenced on July 7, with temperatures in inland locations, such as the Central Valley soaring above . These near to record-breaking temperatures concerned many firefighters, who feared that the high heat, low humidity, and high-elevation winds could make firefighting more strenuous.

Contributing factors
John Juskie, a National Weather Service science officer, was quoted in June 2008 in the Los Angeles Times stating "in historic terms, we're at record dry levels." The spring of 2008 not only broke the record for least inches of rainfall, at 0.17 of an inch, it represented less than one-third of the previous record low of 0.55 of an inch of rainfall in 1934.

A record lack of rainfall, severely dry vegetation and uncharacteristically windy weather combined to create tinderbox conditions across Northern California. In most areas of Northern California, the grasses and brush were as dry in June as they normally would be in October. Moisture content was less than 2%, compared with about 40% normally for this time of year, fire officials stated. In addition, "no one has seen a springtime like this with the winds," Juskie said.

Smoke and air quality 
Air quality in northern and central California deteriorated as a result of smoke from the wildfires, especially in the Central Valley from Bakersfield in the southern San Joaquin Valley section to Redding in the northern Sacramento Valley section.

Northern California
From June 21 to June 27, much of Northern California was covered in a thick blanket of smoke, which reduced visibility and turned the sky yellow and the Moon red.

Some areas endured record levels of air pollution, along with hazardous concentrations of particulate matter. These smoky and hazy conditions prompted health officials to issue air quality advisories and warnings, as particulate matter reached unhealthy levels in the North Bay on June 25. In the San Francisco Bay Area, the Bay Area Air Quality Management District urged the elderly and people with respiratory problems to stay indoors. In spite of the warnings, health officials noted a jump in the number of people with eye and throat irritation. The bad air quality also forced the cancellation of the  Western States Endurance Run, the first in the race's 31-year history. Air quality began to improve on June 28, followed by decreased smoke and improved visibility a day later. By June 30, residents in the Sacramento Valley saw blue skies and good air quality, as a result of onshore winds and the Delta breezes.

However, air quality in Oregon degraded as plumes of smoke drifted northward instead of concentrating in the Central Valley.

Spare the Air
The heat and smoke combined forced public health officials and Gov. Arnold Schwarzenegger to issue "Spare the Air" advisories and an emergency plan for heat waves, respectively. Air quality districts issued another Spare the Air day for July 8, July 9, and July 10, as calm wind conditions in Northern California failed to blow away the smoke from the wildfires. Smoky conditions continued into late August, when most of the wildfires were extinguished. The smoke from the fires finally began to disperse on September 10, after the last of the wildfires was fully contained.

Health Impact
A paper in the American Journal of Respiratory Cell and Molecular Biology studied a group of adolescent rhesus macaque monkeys that were exposed during infancy to smoke from northern California wildfires in 2008. They found that monkeys exposed to wildfire smoke as infants had "significantly reduced inspiratory capacity, residual volume, vital capacity, and functional residual capacity per unit of body weight." There was also a trend of reduced total lung capacity in animals exposed to wildfire smoke as infants. Adolescent monkeys exposed to wildfire smoke as infants were also found to have a lessened PBMCs responses to TLR Ligands. TLR5 has been linked with the asthma phenotype experimentally and in human subjects. An important finding in the study was that monkeys over 200 miles away from the combustion were still found to have significant immune and respiratory changes.

The findings were consistent with many other human group studies and suggest that children who underwent the same experience as the monkeys in the study have a high chance of exhibiting similar health problems but, that because normal development of rhesus monkeys is accelerated compared to human children the relative impact of this amount of wildfire smoke exposure might differ.

November Fires 

The month of November saw a large number of fires, around 2,151, which began burning across Southern California on November 13, with 4 of them becoming major wildfires. At least 400 houses and 500 mobile homes were destroyed. According to USA Today, these wildfires combined with those from October 2007 and the Summer of 2008 were the worst group of wildfires that California had experienced in two decades.

Los Angeles Mayor Antonio Villaraigosa told residents, "If you wait until the fire gets there you have waited too long, this fire can be on you in a moment's notice." California Governor Arnold Schwarzenegger declared a state of emergency in Santa Barbara, Los Angeles, and Orange Counties. Governor Schwarzenegger described the conditions contributing to the fires as a "perfect storm," including strong Santa Ana and sundowner winds, with gusts reaching , as well as high temperatures, low humidity, and dry conditions.

The most significant fires were the following:

 Montecito Tea Fire - a wildfire that started on November 13, 2008, in the wealthy community of Montecito, in Santa Barbara County, California, resulting in the destruction of 210 homes.  Many celebrities have homes in the area of the Tea Fire, including Oprah Winfrey, Rob Lowe, and Steven Spielberg. The home of actor Christopher Lloyd was destroyed in the fire.
 Sayre Fire - a wildfire that started on November 13, 2008, in the Sylmar section of Los Angeles, California, resulting in the destruction of at least 630 structures, including 500 mobile homes, nine single-family homes, and eleven commercial buildings. The loss of more than 500 residences is the "worst loss of homes due to fire" ever in the City of Los Angeles, California, exceeding the loss of 484 residences in the 1961 Bel Air fire.
 Freeway Complex Fire - The combination of 2 wildfires, one of which was known as the Corona Fire by the news media, or Triangle Complex Fire, that started at approximately 9:00 a.m. PDT on November 15, 2008, and spread across the communities of Corona, Chino Hills, Yorba Linda, Anaheim Hills and Brea in Orange and Riverside County, California, and also spread to Diamond Bar in Los Angeles County. Later on November 15, the Landfill Fire ignited at 10:45 AM, and early on May 16, both wildfires merged into the Freeway Complex Fire.

Fatalities
During the season, the National Interagency Fire Center reported 13 firefighter fatalities while battling wildfires. Nine were killed in a helicopter crash, while others died of a heart attack, a falling tree, and an entrapment. In all, 32 people were killed by the wildfires.

See also

October 2007 California wildfires
2017 California wildfires
October 2017 Northern California wildfires
Rush Fire
List of California wildfires

References

 
California, 2008
Wildfires in California by year